Diaper Island is the fourth studio album by Canadian musician Chad VanGaalen, released on May 17, 2011 on Flemish Eye in Canada and Sub Pop in the United States.

Background
It is the first of his own albums which VanGaalen recorded in his new home studio named Yoko Eno (after artists Brian Eno and Yoko Ono), as opposed to the basement studio where he recorded his second and third releases.

Track listing
All songs written by Chad VanGaalen.
 "Do Not Fear"
 "Peace on the Rise"
 "Burning Photographs"
 "Heavy Stones"
 "Sara"
 "Replace Me"
 "Blonde Hash"
 "Freedom for a Policeman"
 "Can You Believe It!?"
 "Wandering Spirits"
 "No Panic / No Heat"
 "Shave My Pussy"

Charts

References

2011 albums
Chad VanGaalen albums
Flemish Eye albums
Sub Pop albums